Elizabeth Grant may refer to:

Elizabeth Grant (songwriter) (1745?–1814?), Scottish songwriter
Elizabeth Grant (health researcher), Scottish academic
Liz Grant (born 1930), Australian pharmacist and politician
Beth Grant (born 1949), American actress
Elizabeth Grant (anthropologist) (born 1963), Australian architect and anthropologist
Lana Del Rey (born 1985), American singer, born Elizabeth Woolridge Grant
Elizabeth Grant (diarist) (1797–1885), British diarist
Elizabeth Grant (Miss England 2016) (born 1996), British beauty pageant titleholder